The Centro Comercial Galerias is a shopping center in San Salvador, El Salvador. Among the mall's attractions is a mansion known as La Casona dating from the late 1950s and kept in perfect condition 
, which was home to a family of Palestinian origin.  It is the only mall to have such an attraction.  The complex is owned by Grupo Siman.

History 
The idea of building the mall, born in early 1990 due to the great development and strength of the capital 
, its construction lasted almost four years and was responsible for SIMCO (sister company Almacenes Siman business group), the first excavations were conducted in order to shape the three levels of underground parking currently to the mall.

One of the main challenges for the construction of the mall was to maintain the mansion called Casona, as more than 2,000 workers had to take extreme security measures to avoid damaging the European architecture.

With the help of a Swiss company, managed to build a ring of security that would protect the mansion, as the excavation depth of 12 meters jeopardized the work.

Currently, Galerias has an area of 115 thousand square meters and has over 133 local and foreign stores.

In 2006 it made its biggest remodeling, where one floor was built (in addition to the three with which the count) and was adapted for cinema Cinépolis Mexican chain.

Shops 

Some stores that owns this mall are:
 Almacenes Siman
 Zara
 Bershka
 Pull and Bear
 Stradivarius
 Guess
 Givenchy
 The North Face
 Nautica
 United Colors of Benetton
 Ralph Lauren
 Starbucks
 Cinepolis

External links 
 Galerias.com.sv
 Siman.com
 Archive.laprensa.co.sv

See also 
 Siman
 Lifestyle Center La Gran Via

Buildings and structures in San Salvador
Shopping malls in El Salvador